Novozhivotinnoye is a rural locality (a selo) and the administrative center of Novozhivotinovskoye Rural Settlement, Ramonsky District, Voronezh Oblast, Russia. The population was 1,997 as of 2010. There are 32 streets.

Geography 
Novozhivotinnoye is located 17 km southwest of Ramon (the district's administrative centre) by road. Mokhovatka is the nearest rural locality.

References 

Rural localities in Ramonsky District